Coleophora abbasella is a moth of the family Coleophoridae that can be found in Iran and Pakistan.

References

External links

abbasella
Moths of Asia
Moths described in 1994